The Buffyverse canon consists of materials that are thought to be genuine (or "official") and those events, characters, settings, etc., that are considered to have inarguable existence within the fictional universe established by the television series Buffy the Vampire Slayer. The Buffyverse is expanded through other additional materials such as comics, novels, pilots, promos and video games which do not necessarily take place in exactly the same fictional continuity as the Buffy episodes and Angel episodes. Star Trek, Star Wars, Stargate and other prolific sci-fi and fantasy franchises have similarly gathered complex fictional continuities through hundreds of stories told in different formats.

Definition
Using the religious analogy of a canon of scripture (see Biblical canon), things that are not canon are considered "apocryphal." When a body of work is not specifically accepted or rejected by an authority, "canon" can be a fluid term that is interpreted differently by different people. This is the case with "Buffyverse canon", which has yet to be publicly defined by an authority to the satisfaction and consensus of all observers (see: links to canon debates). The creator of the Buffyverse, Joss Whedon, has implied that additional materials he was not heavily involved in creating were separate from canon. When asked in an interview about canon, Whedon stated:

Canon listing

This is an overview of what has been dubbed official Buffyverse canon by the series creator Joss Whedon:

All 144 episodes of Buffy the Vampire Slayer
All 110 episodes of Angel
The 1999 comic series The Origin
The Buffy the Vampire Slayer Season Eight comic series and related one-shots
The Buffy the Vampire Slayer Season Nine and Angel and Faith comic series, as well as spin-offs (Spike: A Dark Place and Willow: Wonderland)
The Buffy the Vampire Slayer Season Ten and Angel and Faith Volume 2 comic series
The Buffy the Vampire Slayer Season Eleven and Angel comic series and Giles spin-off
The Buffy the Vampire Slayer Season Twelve comic series
The Angel: After the Fall comic series (#1–17) 
The Spike: After the Fall comic series
The Spike comic series
The Fray comic series
The Tales of the Slayers one-shot 
The Tales of the Vampires comic series

Comics and novels

Outside of the TV series, the Buffyverse has been expanded and elaborated on by various authors and artists in the so-called "Buffyverse Expanded Universe". The Buffyverse novels and Buffyverse comics are licensed by 20th Century Fox, but are generally considered 'less real' within the Buffyverse (apocryphal).

Despite this, they have been licensed as official Buffy the Vampire Slayer or Angel merchandise. Furthermore, many authors have said that Whedon or his office have had to approve their overall outline for their novel or comic if not the final product. This was to prevent the stories venturing too far from the original intentions of Buffy/Angel stories (see below). These works are commonly considered non-canon. Jeff Mariotte, author of Buffyverse novels and comics has said:

Works by Buffyverse writers and cast

Joss Whedon

Work created with Joss Whedon's involvement has been described as canon by commentators, and by Whedon himself. For example, he announced in 2005:

In a separate interview, Whedon spoke of the planning process for the series:

Whedon has also written the comic mini-series Long Night's Journey, as well as short stories for Tales of the Slayers and Tales of the Vampires.

Fray is an eight-part comic series written by Whedon, about a Vampire Slayer of the future named Melaka Fray. In the Buffyverse, a powerful scythe used by Buffy is found in centuries to come by Melaka Fray. In 2001, whilst Whedon was still producing Buffy, he spoke about his concern of implications of information established by Fray (and Buffy comics generally) affecting the canon Buffyverse:

However, the Buffy series finale did not match continuity set by Fray. In Fray no mention is made of the Slayer's essence being split amongst multiple women. When asked about the apparent contradictions between Buffy and Fray, Whedon responded:

In an interview with TV Guide, Whedon revealed that he considered TV tie-in comics to be "ancillary" unless written by the script-writers:

Mutant Enemy

Several of the comics have been written by the scriptwriters of Mutant Enemy Productions. Doug Petrie wrote comics Ring of Fire, Double Cross, and Bad Dog.
Jane Espenson has written comics (Haunted, Jonathan, and Reunion), as well as two Tales of the Slayer prose shorts ("Again, Sunnydale" and "Two Teenage Girls at the Mall"). Rebecca Rand Kirshner also wrote a prose short story for Tales of the Slayer, "The War Between the States".

Buffyverse cast

Two actors have co-authored comics with Christopher Golden. James Marsters, who portrayed Spike, co-authored "Paint the Town Red", whilst Amber Benson co-authored Willow & Tara. Benson also wrote the comic short story "The Innocent".

Works by other authors

All other Buffyverse comics and novels were written by authors that were not involved with any level of production of the television series Buffy the Vampire Slayer or Angel. The creators of these works are generally free to tell their own stories set in the Buffyverse, and may or may not keep to established continuity. Similarly, writers for the TV series were under no obligation to use continuity which has been established by the Expanded Universe, and sometimes contradicted it.

Continuity problems

Usually the authors and editors of these licensed materials try not to contradict information that has been established by canon. However, many of the materials do directly contradict it. Jeff Mariotte has said:

For example, according to Monster Island, Spike and Gunn meet in the Hyperion Hotel in Angel Season 3; however, the canonical Angel TV series later established that Spike and Gunn meet in the Wolfram and Hart L.A. offices in Angel Season 5.

Some of the licensed materials successfully avoid contradicting any information given in episodes. For example, How I Survived My Summer Vacation features short stories that take place after Buffy Season 1 but before Season 2.

Joss Whedon's involvement

A number of comments by Buffyverse writers have indicated that although they know they are not writing Buffyverse canon, overviews for their stories may still have been checked over by Whedon.

Referring to Whedon, Christopher Golden said:

In a separate interview, Golden said:

Similarly, Peter David was asked about his comic, Spike: Old Times, and said:

Jeff Mariotte has revealed more detail of the approval process:

Mariotte implies that little input is given, only acceptance or rejection of general ideas:

When asked how much attention he pays to licensed works, Whedon said:

Elsewhere, Whedon has pointed out that he has never entirely read a single Buffy novel, and has little time to devote to such material. He therefore knows little of the final product, or of their quality control.

Sanction by Joss Whedon
In one instance, Whedon has endorsed a comic neither written nor supervised by him, The Origin by Christopher Golden and Dan Brereton, as canonical. An adaptation of the 1992 Buffy film which was reworked to fit the television series' continuity, Whedon said this of the comic:

Brian Lynch, writer of Spike: Asylum and Spike: Shadow Puppets, had no involvement in the production of the Buffy or Angel television series, but was charged by Joss Whedon with producing the canonical comic series Angel: After The Fall.  Betta George, a character created by Lynch, has since been brought into the official canon. Angel: After the Fall also makes explicit reference to Spike: Asylum within its pages. When After the Fall became an ongoing series penned by various writers, the canonicity of later stories became somewhat nebulous without the explicit say-so of those involved or Whedon himself.

Other Buffy productions

Excluding the Buffy and Angel television episodes, novels, and comics, there have been a variety of other official productions in the Buffy franchise. They are largely regarded as apocryphal, and some are contradicted by other canonical works.

Buffy the Vampire Slayer (1992 film)

Buffy the Vampire Slayer, the 1992 comedy film starring Kristy Swanson as Buffy, was written by Joss Whedon and directed by Fran Rubel Kuzui. In 2001, Whedon described his experience watching the film:

The film contradicts continuity established by the Buffy television series; for example, the nature of vampires differs in significant ways: in the film, vampires do not have "vamp" faces whilst feeding, and can fly. They also do not turn into dust when killed. As noted above, the canonicity of this film is superseded by The Origin.

Television pilots

Whedon wrote and partly funded a 25-minute unaired Buffy pilot to help sell the series concept, but he was not happy with the final product (he has been quoted in an interview about the pilot, "It sucks on ass"). The story is nearly identical to the plot of the first Buffy episode, "Welcome to the Hellmouth", which supersedes it in canon; there are minor canonical changes, including the recasting of some roles and slight personality changes for some characters.

The unaired Angel pitch tape was produced prior to that series. It features Angel speaking toward the camera (possibly breaking the Fourth wall) and narrating action seen in clips.

Video games

The Buffy the Vampire Slayer video games do not contradict continuity established by the series. Furthermore, many of the actors from the shows have provided their voices for the games. Joss Whedon was involved in Chaos Bleeds, and appears in the game's special features.

Undeveloped productions

Mutant Enemy Productions have at various times gone into the early stages of development with potential Buffyverse spinoffs that were ultimately unproduced. Faith the Vampire Slayer, Ripper, Slayer School, and the Spike movie would have taken place within the same fictional continuity. Buffy the Animated Series might have followed a slightly alternative continuity since promotional artwork has shown that the Sunnydale High library would have looked dramatically different from in the Buffy episodes.

The David Fury-written script "Corrupt" establishes an alternative continuity after the premiere Angel episode, "City of". Events that take place in the story are instead superseded by the continuity of the second Angel episode, "Lonely Hearts", the episode which was written to replace "Corrupt".

Unofficial works

Various works are not licensed by 20th Century Fox as Buffy/Angel merchandise, and do not have any involvement from any Buffyverse cast and crew. These include adult (pornographic) parodies and fan films.

References

External links
Buffy Canon vs. Fanon
Whedonesque.com – A long debate over what is or is not 'canon'

Buffyverse
Canons (fiction)